The Journal-News is a daily newspaper published by Cox Enterprises in Liberty Township, Butler County, Ohio, United States. It formed in 2013 from the merger of the Hamilton JournalNews in Hamilton and The Middletown Journal in Middletown. Journal-News is intended to be a full-size daily newspaper with minimal coverage of Cincinnati and Dayton. It shares staff and resources with its sister publication,  the Dayton Daily News and competes with The Cincinnati Enquirer.

From 2013 to 2016, the Journal-News was combined with Journal-News Pulse (formerly Today's Pulse, which itself was the result of merged editions of weekly newspapers from neighboring Warren County. The Pulse was then folded into the Journal-News.

References

External links
 

Newspapers published in Ohio
Cox Newspapers
Butler County, Ohio
Daily newspapers published in the United States
Hamilton, Ohio
Newspapers established in 2013
2013 establishments in Ohio